Shivanat Rural District is in Afshar District of Khodabandeh County, Zanjan province, Iran. At the National Census of 2006, its population was 8,963 in 1,919 households. There were 8,469 inhabitants in 2,229 households at the following census of 2011. At the most recent census of 2016, the population of the rural district was 6,778 in 1,870 households. The largest of its 34 villages was Qui, with 793 people.

References 

Khodabandeh County

Rural Districts of Zanjan Province

Populated places in Zanjan Province

Populated places in Khodabandeh County